A cat exercise wheel is a large wheel that a cat either runs on or walks on for exercise or play. A cat wheel looks like a large hamster wheel: the wheel turns from the weight of the cat. A wheel can be used for enrichment or to exercise high energy indoor cats. The wheels are generally 120 cm in diameter, with a depth of 25 cm. There are several pioneering brands, such as Cat One Fast and Tirica Wheels.

Indoor cats
Many cats are kept in homes or small apartments and they do not have opportunities to run in the outdoors or burn off extra fat. In addition overweight cats may develop diseases such as diabetes. A cat wheel can assist cats in burning extra calories. Activity and play is good for cats. Playing will help keep an indoor cat's body toned and keep its mind active.

Because cats are traditionally not walked on a leash or let outside they can become obese without enrichment and exercise.

See also
Cat toys
 Behavioral enrichment
 Treadwheel

References

External links
 Article from ASPCA's Virtual Pet Behaviorist on cat toys
 Opportunities, prerequisites, pros and cons (in German)
 Hazards of cat toys (ASPCA)

Cat behavior
Cat equipment
Play (activity)
Toys
Animal welfare
Wheels